Donald James Lofgran (November 18, 1928 – June 17, 1976) was an American basketball player who was a consensus All-American in 1950 while at the University of San Francisco. He also played professionally in the National Basketball Association (NBA) from 1950 to 1954.

Lofgran, a native of Oakland, California and 1946 graduate of Oakland Technical High School, spent the first two years of college (1946–48) at Grant Technical College, a junior college in Sacramento California (now American River College). He graduated Grant Tech and enrolled at the University of San Francisco to play for the Dons basketball team. While at USF, Lofgran averaged approximately 15 points per game for his career. In his junior season of 1948–49, Lofgran led the Dons to a 48–47 win over Loyola (IL) in the 1949 National Invitation Tournament and was named the Most Valuable Player.

Lofgran was drafted as the 11th pick in the first round of the 1950 NBA draft by the Syracuse Nationals. He was traded to the Indianapolis Olympians his rookie year. During Lofgran's four year NBA career, he also played for the Philadelphia Warriors and Milwaukee Hawks.

References

External links
College stats at TheDraftReview

1928 births
1976 deaths
All-American college men's basketball players
Amateur Athletic Union men's basketball players
American men's basketball players
Basketball players from Oakland, California
Indianapolis Olympians players
Junior college men's basketball players in the United States
Milwaukee Hawks players
Philadelphia Warriors players
San Francisco Dons men's basketball players
Small forwards
Syracuse Nationals draft picks
Utica Pros players